Isabelle Stoehr (born June 9, 1979, in Tours) is a professional squash player from France.

Career statistics
Listed below

Professional Tour Titles (9)
All Results for Isabelle Stoehr in WISPA World's Tour tournament

Note: (ret) = retired, min = minutes, h = hours

WISPA Tour Finals (runner-up) (6)

References

External links
 
 

French female squash players
1979 births
Living people
Sportspeople from Tours, France
Competitors at the 2005 World Games